Christian Neureuther (born 28 April 1949) is a former World Cup alpine ski racer from Germany.

Racing career
Born and raised in Garmisch-Partenkirchen, Bavaria, Neureuther specialized in the slalom and won six World Cup races and attained twenty podiums. He competed for West Germany in three Winter Olympics (1972, 1976, and 1980) and was fifth in the slalom in both 1976 and 1980. Neureuther was the runner-up to Gustav Thöni in the World Cup season slalom standings in 1973 and 1974; he was fourth overall in 1973 and ninth in 1974.

Personal
Until her death in 2023, Neureuther was married to Rosi Mittermaier, a double gold medalist at the 1976 Winter Olympics and the overall World Cup champion in 1976. Married in 1980, they are the parents of Felix Neureuther (b.1984), a retired World Cup ski racer for Germany.

World Cup results

Season standings

Points were only awarded for top ten finishes (see scoring system).

Race podiums
 6 wins – (6 SL)
 20 podiums – (20 SL); 59 top tens

World championship results 

From 1948 through 1980, the Winter Olympics were also the World Championships for alpine skiing.
At the World Championships from 1954 through 1980, the combined was a "paper race" using the results of the three events (DH, GS, SL).

Olympic results

External links
 
 Christian Neureuther World Cup standings at the International Ski Federation
 
 

1949 births
Living people
Sportspeople from Garmisch-Partenkirchen
German male alpine skiers
Olympic alpine skiers of West Germany
Alpine skiers at the 1972 Winter Olympics
Alpine skiers at the 1976 Winter Olympics
Alpine skiers at the 1980 Winter Olympics
Universiade medalists in alpine skiing
Universiade gold medalists for West Germany
Competitors at the 1970 Winter Universiade
20th-century German people